Didi Taihuttu (born in Venlo on 26 May 1978) is a Dutch entrepreneur, traveler, author, writer en speaker, mainly known because of living the Bitcoin standard cryptocurrency.

Taihuttu got known because he and his family sold all belongings in 2017 and went all in Bitcoin to live fully bankless solely with BTC bitcoinmunt. The Family was named 'the bitcoin family'. He appeared in the TV shows Gert Late Night, De Wereld Draait Door , Jinek and Pauw. Documentaries about him were published by Arte, CNBC, The Wall Street Journal, videoland, streamz and CNA. The family went living in Portugal because of the very positive tax rules on cryptocurrency.

Biography 
Didi Taihuttu is the son of the professional football player of VVV-Venlo John Taihuttu. He studied Higher Economic Education at the Fontys Hogeschool in Venlo, after which he started his career in the Swiss Zug. After a number of short-term jobs, he chose to start his own computer training company at the age of 24 and has been working as an entrepreneur ever since.

Bibliography  
 2018: Didi & The Bitcoin Family 
 2019: Die Bitcoin Familie: Wie Mut uns zum Glück führte (to ₿ or not to ₿)

Documentaries 
 2017: CNBC
 2017: Y-Kollektiv – Bitcoin: Blase oder digitales gold?  Der Hype um die Kryptowährung
 2018: Arte.tv
 2018: The Wall Street Journal
 2018: CNA
 2021: VIDEOLAND – Cryptokoorts
 2022: STREAMZ – Is Crypto het nieuwe goud

References

External links 
 
 Website The Bitcoin Family

Dutch businesspeople
Living people

1978 births